Stephen Chinedu (born 6 January 2000) is a Nigerian professional footballer who currently plays as a forward for Albanian club Dinamo Tirana.

References

2000 births
Living people
People from Kano
Association football forwards
Nigerian footballers
HNK Hajduk Split II players
NK Dugopolje players
FK Dinamo Tirana players
NK Solin players
Kategoria Superiore players
First Football League (Croatia) players
Nigerian expatriate footballers
Nigerian expatriate sportspeople in Albania
Expatriate footballers in Albania
Nigerian expatriate sportspeople in Croatia
Expatriate footballers in Croatia